The Mohafiz is a family of internal security vehicles designed and manufactured by Heavy Industries Taxila with Cavalier Group also designing later production models.

Development
Early in 2000, HIT started design work on a new 4×4 internal security (IS) vehicle called the Mohafiz. This was first shown in mid-November 2000 and in December 2000 started extensive trials.

Engine
It is powered by a 4.2 litre diesel engine coupled to a manual transmission with five forward and one reverse gears and a two speed transfer case. If required, a more powerful 4.5 litre diesel engine could be installed to provide a higher power-to-weight ratio.

Although the first example of the Mohafiz is based on a Toyota Land Cruiser chassis, it could also be built on other 4 × 4 chassis. This includes the Land Rover Defender 110 (4 × 4), which is already in service with the Pakistan Army in large numbers.

Vehicles supplied to Iraq were based on a Land Rover 110 (4 × 4) chassis.

Design
The Mohafiz APC has an all-welded aluminium armour body that provides the occupants with protection from small arms fire up to 7.62 mm in calibre and shell splinters. The fully enclosed engine compartment is at the front with the crew compartment extending to the rear.

The commander and driver are seated at the front and provided with bulletproof windows to their front and a forward opening door with a bulletproof window in the upper part of either side. These bulletproof windows are covered by wire mesh screens. The bulletproof windows provide the same level of protection as the armoured hull.

The troop compartment is at the rear with the troops seated on either side on bench seats and enter the vehicle via a large door in the rear opening to the right.

Bulletproof windows are provided in the sides and rear of the troop compartment. A total of ten firing ports are provided to allow rifles and other small arms to be used from within the vehicle. The upper parts of the hull slope slightly inwards as does the hull rear.

Mounted on the forward part of the roof is a manually operated one person turret armed with a 7.62 mm machine gun and/or a tear gas grenade launcher and a two part roof hatch which opens left and right. Vehicles delivered to Iraq are fitted with a one-person turret armed with a 7.62 mm PK machine gun.

To the immediate rear of the turret are two forward opening roof hatches although the design of the vehicle is flexible so that various types of roof hatch arrangement are possible.

Operational History 
The Mohafiz have been heavily used by Pakistani security forces in the Balochistan province of Pakistan.
In March 2020, a Frontier Corps convoy was ambushed by BLF terrorists at Buleda in Kech District. A heavy gunfight ensued with the Militants and in the process, the Mohafiz was struck by an Improvised explosive device, however the ASV survived the explosion.

Variants 
 Mohafiz
First model.
 Mohafiz II
2nd model.
 Mohafiz III
3rd model of the Mohafiz Series.
 Mohafiz IV/Interceptor
ASV based on the Toyota LC79 series chasis with major improvements. Developed & manufactured jointly by the Cavalier group and Heavy Industries Taxila (HIT).

Operators

Current operators

Iraqi Army - 60 Mohafiz ISV's delivered by Pakistan in 2006.

Civilian operator

Sindh Police - 60 delivered by Wah Ordnance Factory in 2012.

References

Science and technology in Pakistan
Internal security vehicles
Armoured fighting vehicles of the post–Cold War period
Armoured fighting vehicles of Pakistan
Military vehicles introduced in the 2000s